Simon Rowland Francis Price (27 September 1954, London – 14 June 2011) was an English classical scholar, specialising in the imperial cult of ancient Rome.

Personal life
He was the son of the Anglican bishop Hetley Price.

Education
Price studied at Manchester Grammar School, Queen's College, Oxford (BA and DPhil), University College London (where he was supervised by John North for his Oxford thesis) and Christ's College, Cambridge (junior research fellow), as well as teaching at Lady Margaret Hall, Oxford (tutor and research fellow).

Bibliography
 Simon Price, Rituals and Power: The Roman Imperial Cult in Asia Minor (1986)  
 Mary Beard, John North and Simon Price, Religions of Rome (1998);  (vol. 1),  (vol. 2)
 Simon Price, Religions of the Ancient Greeks (1999)  
 Simon Price and Peter Thonemann,  The Birth of Classical Europe: A History from Troy to Augustine (2011)

Necrology
John North. "Simon Price obituary. Key figure in the study of Graeco-Roman religious history." In The Guardian August 21, 2011
"Dr Simon Price (1954-2011)" Society for Classical Studies
"Simon Price" The Telegraph 27 July 2011

References

1954 births
2011 deaths
British historians of religion
English classical scholars
Alumni of The Queen's College, Oxford
Alumni of University College London
Alumni of Christ's College, Cambridge
Fellows of Christ's College, Cambridge
Fellows of Lady Margaret Hall, Oxford
Historians of ancient Rome
Scholars of ancient Greek history
Deaths from cancer